Ray Williams (1951-2016), was a Welsh international lawn bowls player.

Bowls career
He won a bronze medal in the men's pairs at the 1978 Commonwealth Games in Edmonton with Jim Morgan.

Four years later he represented Wales again in the fours at the Lawn Bowls at the 1982 Commonwealth Games. He died in August 2016.

References

Welsh male bowls players
Commonwealth Games bronze medallists for Wales
Bowls players at the 1978 Commonwealth Games
Bowls players at the 1982 Commonwealth Games
Commonwealth Games medallists in lawn bowls
1951 births
2016 deaths
Medallists at the 1978 Commonwealth Games